Angulomastacator (meaning "bend chewer", in reference to both the shape of its upper jaw and to the Big Bend area of the Rio Grande, where the type specimen was found) is a genus of duck-billed dinosaur from the Campanian-age (Late Cretaceous) Aguja Formation of Big Bend National Park, Texas. It is known from a single specimen, TMM 43681–1, a partial left maxilla (the main tooth-bearing bone of the upper jaw).  This bone is curved down approximately 45° at its anterior end, with the tooth row bent to fit, unlike any other hadrosaur.  The unusual characteristics of the maxilla, which have not been reported from elsewhere, supports the hypothesis that the dinosaurs of the Aguja Formation were endemic forms.  It was discovered in the upper shale member of the Aguja Formation, among plant, bone, and clam fragments in a bed interpreted as the deposits of a small tributary channel.  This bed is just below rocks of the overlying Javelina Formation.  Volcanic rocks at about the same level have been dated to 76.9 ± 1.2 million years ago.

Angulomastacator is classified as a lambeosaurine, the group of hadrosaurs with hollow cranial crests.  It was described in 2009 by Wagner and Lehman in 2009. The type species is A. daviesi, named for Kyle L. Davies, who in 1983 was the first to postulate the presence of a lambeosaurine in the Aguja Formation.  As a hadrosaurid, Angulomastacator would have been a bipedal/quadrupedal herbivore, eating plants with sets of ever-replacing teeth stacked on each other.

See also
 Timeline of hadrosaur research

 2009 in paleontology

References

Late Cretaceous dinosaurs of North America
Lambeosaurines
Fossil taxa described in 2009
Paleontology in Texas
Campanian genus first appearances
Campanian genus extinctions
Ornithischian genera